The Kronshtadt Orion is a family of Russian unmanned aerial vehicles (UAV) developed by Kronstadt Group. There are several variants of the drone, both for Russia's domestic and export market.

Development
Kronstadt began the development of Orion in 2011 as part of the Russian MoD-funded Inokhodets programme. In 2013–2015, the company revealed the first layout of the Orion. In May 2016, RIA Novosti reported that test flights of the drone had begun.

On 24 August 2021, it was reported that the Russian MoD and Kronshtadt signed a deal for the procurement of 5 combat groups of an upgraded version of Orion, Inokhodets-RU (also known as Sirius). Each group will have several drones; delivery is scheduled for 2023.

The large-scale Russian-Belarusian exercise Zapad in September 2021 included Orion drones.

Operational history
According to Russian Defense Minister Sergei Shoigu, the Orion was tested for strike missions in 2019 in Syria. In 2020, the Russian Defence Ministry received the first batch of Orion drones for trial operation.

By 9 April during the 2022 Russian invasion of Ukraine, there was video confirmation of Orion performing six successful strikes on Ukrainian vehicles, however the first combat loss of a drone was reported on 7 April.

Variants
Orion (Inokhodets)
Can carry four guided bombs or four missiles and has a maximum payload of 200 kg.

Orion-E
Export version of the Orion. Export contracts for the reconnaissance version of the drone have been signed.

Orion-2 (Helios)

Also known as Helios, the Orion-2 is a larger version of the original Orion, with a bigger payload, classified as a high-altitude long-endurance (HALE) UAV, rather than the medium-altitude long-endurance (MALE) classification of the original Orion. It weighs 5 tonnes (11,000 pounds) with a wingspan of 30 meters (98.42 feet). It is intended for autonomous operations of up to 30 hours, at altitudes above 10,000 meters. A full scale mock-up was unveiled on August 27, 2020, at the Kronstadt pilot plant. The first flight is planned for 2023. There is also an export version of Orion-2.

Inokhodets-RU (Sirius)
Also known as Sirius, the Inokhodets-RU is an upgraded variant of the Orion with a bigger and different design, the key difference being twin engines. Sirius is a medium-altitude long-endurance (MALE) attack UAV, with a wingspan of 30m, length of 9m and height of 3.3m, a maximum combat load of 450kg, cruise speed of 295km/h, maximum altitude 12,000m, and an endurance of 40 hours. A full-size mock-up of the 5 tonne drone was presented at the MAKS-2019 International Aviation and Space Exposition held at Zhukovsky International Airport near Moscow, Russia. First flight is expected for 2022, to enter service in 2023. Inokhodets-RU has been tested jointly with piloted aircraft as of August 2022.

Specifications (Orion-E)

See also
Sokol Altius
Luch Korsar
Sukhoi S-70 Okhotnik-B

References

Unmanned military aircraft of Russia
Aircraft first flown in 2019
2010s Russian military aircraft